The Pacific Tigers football team represented the University of the Pacific in NCAA Division I-A (now FBS) college football. The team competed in the Big West Conference during their last season in 1995. They played their home games at Stagg Memorial Stadium in Stockton, California. On December 19, 1995, the Board of Regents voted to disband the team in order to save money for the athletic program, which was reported to have gone over $400,000 in debt. All scholarships were honored for current players of the team.

The 1943 Pacific Tigers football team was an independent during the 1943 college football season. In their 11th season under head coach Amos Alonzo Stagg, the Tigers compiled a record of 7–2 and finished the season ranked No. 19 in the AP Poll. The Tigers played home games at Baxter Stadium in Stockton. The Tigers beat a strong UCLA Bruins team, the No. 20 ranked Cal Bears and No. 10 ranked Saint Mary's Gaels. This led the 1943 Tigers Defensive Line to be rated 'the strongest in the West.' The team was at one time ranked No. 6 in the nation by the Associated Press The 1943 team produced Pacific's 1st All-Americans in Tackle Al McCaffrey and Running Back John Podesto. Amos Alonzo Stagg was also named "Coach of the Year" by the American Football Coaches Association and the Football Writers Association of America  

The 1949 Pacific Tigers football team was an independent during the 1949 college football season. In their third season under head coach Larry Siemering, the Tigers compiled an undefeated and untied 11–0 record, were ranked No. 10 in the final AP Poll, and outscored all opponents by a combined total of 575 to 66. The Tigers' victories included wins over Cincinnati, San Diego State, San Jose State, Fresno State, Nevada, Hawaii, and Utah.

Quarterback Eddie LeBaron was selected by both the Associated Press and International News Service as a first-team player on the 1949 All-Pacific Coast football team. Don Campora and Eddie LeBaron were both selected in the following 1950 NFL draft

Conference affiliations
 1895–1924: Independent
 1925–1942: Far West Conference
 1943–1945: Independent
 1946–1948: California Collegiate Athletic Association
 1949–1968: Independent
 1969–1995: Pacific Coast Athletic Association/Big West Conference

Conference championships

Bowl games
The Pacific Tigers played in 6 bowl games total, but only 3 NCAA-sanctioned bowl games with a record of 2–1.

† Not an NCAA-sanctioned bowl game

Home stadiums

1895-1899
Cyclers' Park -San Jose, CA 

1919-1922 
C.O.P. Field -San Jose, CA

1923-1928
College of the Pacific Field -Stockton, CA

1929-1949
Baxter Stadium -Stockton, CA 
Capacity (12,000)

1948-1949
Grape Bowl Stadium -Lodi, CA
 Only 3 games Capacity (18,000)

1950-1995
Amos Alonzo Stagg Memorial Stadium -Stockton, CA
Capacity (35,975- 28,000)

Amos Alonzo Stagg Memorial Stadium, previously known as Pacific Memorial Stadium, was a 28,000-seat outdoor multi-purpose stadium, located on the campus of the University of the Pacific in Stockton, California. The home venue of the Pacific Tigers was constructed in 1950 for football and later hosted women's soccer; it was closed in 2012 and demolished two years later.

Pacific Memorial Stadium was built  in 1950 after the successful fund drive which netted $165,000. Construction began on the earth-filled structure in May 1950.  Astonishingly, it was finished on time for the home opener (fifth game of the season) on October 21, a build time of less than six months. The field's approximate alignment was north-northwest to south-southeast. It has been reported and researched the stadium was built on a former Yokuts village. These remains found were discovered in 1923 and raised concern for when the stadium was set to be demolished.

The stadium originally seated 35,975 with room for expansion to over 44,000, but renovations reduced the capacity to a configuration of 28,000. It was the venue for a 1997 friendly soccer match between Brazil and Honduras; notable striker Ronaldo scored six goals and Brazil won 8–2.

"The Pacific Club", which was added to the east-side of the stadium in 1973, was donated by Alex Spanos at a cost of $250,000.  It sat up to 300 people, featured glass walls and had great views of the stadium.  When not in use for sporting events, it also held many university functions and gatherings.  The scoreboard in the north end zone was erected in 1982 at a cost of $140,000 and measured .  Thanks to donations from athletic boosters, lighting power at the stadium was upgraded from 35 to 75 footcandles in August 1986.

Pacific Memorial Stadium was officially renamed Amos Alonzo Stagg Memorial Stadium on October 15, 1988, to honor Amos Alonzo Stagg (1862–1965). He ended his head coaching career at "College of the Pacific" in 1946, and donated the land for the stadium to be built in 1950. 

On February 26, 2012, the university announced it would close Stagg Memorial Stadium to conduct a feasibility study to assess needed repairs, upgrades and changes required to make the facility meet modern standards in conjunction with a financial assessment to determine if the stadium could be repaired or if it should be replaced.

The university began removal of Stagg Memorial Stadium on February 24, 2014, to make room for new athletics facilities, including a dedicated tennis center with 12 courts and a clubhouse, and new fields for soccer and field hockey.  The first Pacific field hockey home game on the new turf field at University of the Pacific was played on September 12, 2014, versus the University of Albany.  The groundbreaking ceremony for the Eve Zimmerman Tennis Center was held on October 17, 2014.

In April 2022 the Stagg Memorial Plaza was dedicated and open to the public on the grounds of the old stadium. The 9,000 sq. ft. plaza, located off of Larry Heller Drive across from the Alex G. Spanos Center, is "envisioned as a gathering place for alumni and students who will learn of the storied history of Pacific Football through the stories and statues encircling the plaza. The plaza will also serve as a campus destination hosting several tailgates and gatherings annually associated with athletic and campus events."

Rivalries

San Jose State
Battle for the Victor's Bell

The now defunct, nearly 100 year, rivalry match up between the SJSU Spartans and the Pacific Tigers began in January 1896 and ended in 1995 when Pacific dropped its football program. The 'Spartan-Tiger Football Game' was played 72 times between 1896 and 1995.

Due to the "private vs. public" institutional competitiveness and the close geographical proximity of the two schools, a natural "cross-town" rivalry was born. University of the Pacific was founded in 1851 in Santa Clara, California, and claims to be the first institution of higher education in California. San José State University was founded in 1857 and is California's first public institution of higher education. 

In 1949, in a game which drew national attention, the "Victor's Bell" was unveiled. The Victor's Bell would go to the winner of subsequent Tiger-Spartan games. The bell was two feet tall and waist-high on a rolling cart. The bell was half black with an orange "P" for Pacific and half blue with a gold "SJ" for San Jose.

The Spartans led the series 43–23–6 when the rivalry ended at the close of the 1995 season.

Final AP Poll rankings

National and Conference Award Winner

Pop Warner Trophy 
The Glenn "Pop" Warner Memorial Trophy was awarded annually by the Palo Club to the most valuable senior player on the West Coast.  It was awarded from 1949 to 2004.  Notably, all but 5 recipients played for Pac-8/Pac-10 institutions.  The award is distinguished from the unaffiliated W. J. Voit Memorial Trophy, presented annually from 1951 to 1978 to the top player on the Pacific Coast regardless of class-year.

Eddie LeBaron, was the inaugural Pop Warner Memorial Trophy recipient in 1949.

National Football Foundation Gold Medal

The National Football Foundation recognizes individuals who demonstrate outstanding support for promoting the game of amateur football. The NFF Gold Medal is the highest award offered by the National Football Foundation. 

AFCA Coach of the Year

Football Writers Association of America Coach of the Year

Corbett Award

This honor is awarded annually by the National Association of Collegiate Directors of Athletics (NACDA). It is presented "to the collegiate administrator who has most typified Corbett's devotion to intercollegiate athletics and worked unceasingly for its betterment." 

National Football Foundation National Scholar-Athlete Award

Individual honors

Retired numbers

College Football Hall of Fame

Pro Football Hall of Fame

All-Americans

Notable players and alumni

Pete Carroll
Hue Jackson
Walt Harris
Ron Turner
Greg Robinson
Jon Gruden
Ed Donatell
Dante Scarnecchia
Bruce Coslet
Greg Seamon
Brad Seely
John Fassel
Chester Caddas
Bob Lee
Jack Myers
Tom Flores
Michael Meriwether
Nick Holt
Eddie LeBaron
Don Campora
Bob Cope
Eddie Macon
Amos Alonzo Stagg
Wayne Hardin 
Dick Bass
Willard Harrell
Troy Kopp
Willie Hector
John Nisby
Wayne Hawkins

References

External links

 Year-by-year record at Sportsreference.com
 Stripes of the Tiger (documentary film website)

 
American football teams established in 1895
American football teams disestablished in 1995
1895 establishments in California
1995 disestablishments in California